Amawaka may refer to:
 Amawaka people, an ethnic group of the Amazon
 Amawaka language
 Amawaka (film)

Language and nationality disambiguation pages